The Prize is a 2011 Mexican drama film directed by Paula Markovitch. The film was screened In Competition at the 61st Berlin International Film Festival.

Awards
The film was in the competition for the Golden Bear at the 61st Berlin International Film Festival in 2011. It was awarded:
 Silver Bear for outstanding artistic contribution (Production Design) - Barbara Enriquez
 Silver Bear for outstanding artistic contribution (Camera) - Wojciech Staron

References

External links
 

2011 films
Best Picture Ariel Award winners
2010s Spanish-language films
2011 drama films
Silver Bear for outstanding artistic contribution
Mexican drama films
2010s Mexican films